Sambuugiin Oyuuntsetseg (born 15 December 1964) is a Mongolian archer. She competed in the women's individual and team events at the 1988 Summer Olympics.

References

External links
 

1964 births
Living people
Mongolian female archers
Olympic archers of Mongolia
Archers at the 1988 Summer Olympics
Place of birth missing (living people)
20th-century Mongolian women